Mary Averil Webb (born 9 April 1936) is a New Zealand former cricketer who played as a right-handed batter, right-arm off break bowler and occasional wicket-keeper. She appeared in four Test matches for New Zealand between 1957 and 1961. She played domestic cricket for Otago.

References

External links
 
 

1936 births
Living people
Cricketers from Dunedin
New Zealand women cricketers
New Zealand women Test cricketers
Otago Sparks cricketers